Lajja may refer to:

 Lajja (novel), a 1993 novel by Taslima Nasrin
 Lajja (2001 film), an Indian Hindi social drama film